Carter Coal Company Store may refer to:

Carter Coal Company Store (Caretta, West Virginia), listed on the National Register of Historic Places (NRHP) in West Virginia
Carter Coal Company Store (Coalwood, West Virginia), listed on the NRHP in West Virginia